The 3rd Best Of Nollywood Awards were held on Friday November 11, 2011 at the Lagoon Restaurant, Lagos. Top musical artist like JJC, W4, Capital F.E.M.I & Adol performed during the event.

References

2011 film awards
2011 in Nigerian cinema
2011
Culture in Lagos State
Entertainment events in Nigeria
21st century in Lagos
2010s in Nigerian cinema